Balefire may refer to:

Balefire (novel series), a series of young adult novels by Cate Tiernan
Balefire, a form of magic in the Wheel of Time series of novels